Hansruedi Widmer (born 4 April 1944) is a retired speed skater from Switzerland. He competed at the 1968 Winter Olympics in the 500 m and 1500 m events and finished beyond the 40th position. 

Personal bests:
500 m – 40.4 (1973)
1000 m – 1:22.9 (1973)
1500 m – 2:10.05 (1974)
5000 m – 8:00.2 (1969)
10000 m - 16:46.5 (1969)

References

External links
 
 Hansruedi WIDMER. les-sports.info

1944 births
Living people
Olympic speed skaters of Switzerland
Speed skaters at the 1968 Winter Olympics
Swiss male speed skaters
Sportspeople from Basel-Stadt